Hagerman Wildlife Management Area at  is an Idaho wildlife management area in Gooding County south of the town of Hagerman. The first land acquisition for the WMA was in 1940 and now includes land licensed from the U.S. Fish and Wildlife Service. 

The area is along the Snake River and attracts many birds, including ducks, geese, and raptors. The WMA has several trails, a viewing blind, and hunting opportunities.

References

Protected areas established in 1940
Protected areas of Gooding County, Idaho
Wildlife management areas of Idaho
1940 establishments in Idaho